Daphne pseudomezereum is a shrub, of the family Thymelaeaceae.  It is native to Japan, specifically Honshu, and Korea.

Description
The shrub is evergreen, and grows to about 1 m tall. It flowers green in March and April and is deciduous in the summer. Some variants found in Korea are deciduous in the winter instead.

References

pseudomezereum
Flora of Japan
Flora of Korea